Agnippe fuscopulvella is a moth in the family Gelechiidae. It is found in North America, where it has been recorded from Kentucky.

The forewings are whitish, tinged with yellowish-ochreous, densely dusted with fuscous.

References

Agnippe
Moths described in 1872
Moths of North America